Robert Ashton (1950) is an Australian photographer and photojournalist.

Early life and education 
Robert Ashton was born on August 11, 1950 in Melbourne. He studied Photography at Prahran College 1969-71 and graduated with a Diploma of Visual Arts and Design.

Career 
In the early 1970s, Robert Ashton shared house with Carol Jerrems and Ian Macrae in Mozart Street, St Kilda, their artist associates being Ingeborg Tyssen, Paul Cox and Bill Heimerman, and Ashton's cousin Rennie Ellis with whom he shared a studio in Greville Street, Prahran. From 1974 to 1981, Ashton was assistant director at Ellis's Brummels Gallery in Toorak Road, South Yarra, where he also exhibited.

Photography curator Judy Annear notes that;
 

His subject matter includes urban indigenous, life and incidents in inner suburbia in Melbourne, particularly Fitzroy. Writer and musician Mark Gillespie, who had become involved in a new publishing venture, Outback Press, with Fred Milgrom Colin Talbot and Morry Schwartz, commissioned Ashton for the book Into the Hollow Mountain. Its images, of "kids on the prowl, the old Salvo street bands, the Koorie clans, the card joint kaphenois", were first shown at Brummels in a exhibition of that title in 1974, and when re-exhibited forty years later at Colour Factory, "serve as a rare documentation of day-to-day Melbourne and glimpse into an era that, while not actually all that distant, is most definitely a thing of the past."

Ashton has published several other books, of portraits and close-up, abstracted landscape, and exhibited widely in Australia. His photograph Bernard Diving featured in the 1988 exhibition, and on the cover its catalogue, The Thousand Mile Stare, a survey of Australian photography published by the Victorian Centre for Photography.

In pursuing the best quality output for his imagery, Ashton adopted, and currently uses, hand-built large format cameras and advanced printing techniques including photogravure and the Collodion process.

He lives on Victoria's Surf Coast, and imagery of the ocean and landscape is a consistent interest.

Exhibitions

Solo 
 1973 Faces and Places, Brummels Gallery, Melbourne
 1974 Into the Hollow Mountains: A Portrait of Fitzroy, Brummels Gallery
 1976 Between Light and Dark, Australian Centre for Photography, Sydney
 1976 Between Light and Dark, Brummels Gallery, Melbourne
 1979 Adventures in Paradise? Church Street Photographic Centre, Melbourne
 1987 Adventures in Paradise?, Australian Centre for Photography, Sydney.
 1990 Photogravure Images, United Artists Gallery, Melbourne.
 1993 What are you Doing? What are you Saying?, Luba Bilu Gallery, Melbourne
 2000 Hidden Things, Qdos Gallery, Lorne
 2001 Life Sanctuary, Patricia Autore Gallery, Melbourne
 2003 Different Dreams-Same Reality, Patricia Autore Gallery, Melbourne
 2005 Evidence, Little Malop Gallery, Geelong
 2006 Visual Instinct, Libby Edwards Gallery - Melbourne
 2007 Recognition, Pigment Gallery, Prague
 2009 Snapshots from the edge, Qdos Gallery, Lorne
 2009 Photographs from the edge, Monash Gallery of Art
 2012 Postmortem, Edmund Pearce Gallery, Melbourne
 2013 Interior/Exterior, Edmund Pearce Gallery, Melbourne
 2014 Into The Hollow Mountains, Colour Factory Gallery, Melbourne
 2014 Interior/Exterior + Postmortem gravures, Black Eye Gallery, Sydney
 2015 Thin Air, Qdos Gallery, Lorne
 2015, 6 Aug - 29 Aug; Thin Air, Colour Factory Gallery, 409-429 Gore St, Fitzroy
 2021, 3–25 Apr,  Bush Theatre, Qdos Gallery, Lorne

Group 
 1982 Ray Hughes Gallery, Brisbane. 
 1988 The Thousand Mile Stare, Victorian Centre for Photography
 1988 Artery Gallery, Geelong. 
 1990 Qdos Gallery, Lorne. 1990
 1991 Special . . . It's Been Used Before, Luba Bilu Gallery. 
 1991 Survey - A Regional Review, Geelong Art Gallery.
 1998 Waterproof, Centro Cultural de Belem, Lisbon Portugal.
 2003 Australian Photographic Portrait Prize, Art Gallery of NSW. 
 2007 Ulrich and Schubert Photography award, Gold Coast City Art Gallery
 2007 Bowness Photography prize, Monash Gallery of Art. 
 2010 Bowness Photography prize 2010, Monash Gallery of Art. 
 2011 Ulrich and Schubert Photography award, Gold Coast City Art Gallery.
 2020, 31 October 2020 – 7 February 2021  Bowness Photography prize 2020, Monash Gallery of Art.

Collections 
 Hallmark Cards Collection, National Gallery of Australia
 National Gallery of Victoria
 Phillip Morris Collection, Australian National Gallery
 Art Gallery of New South Wales
 Tasmanian Museum and Art Gallery
 John Sands Collection
 Charles Darwin University

Publications

References 

1950 births
20th-century Australian photographers
Australian curators
Living people
Photographers from Melbourne
21st-century Australian photographers